Events from the year 1784 in Russia

Incumbents
 Monarch – Catherine II

Events
 God - completed by poet Gavrila Derzhavin
 Orlov Trotter - birth of Bars I, considered first of breed
 Vladikavkaz founded

Births
 Joseph Bové - architect
 Catherine Herbert, Countess of Pembroke - Russian noblewoman who married Gen. George Herbert, 11th Earl of Pembroke
 Teodor Narbutt - historian and military engineer
 Grand Duchess Elena Pavlovna of Russia - daughter of Paul I of Russia
 Arkadi Suvorov - general
 Paul von Krüdener - diplomat, second ambassador to the United States

Deaths
 Prince Adarnase of Kartli - general
 Zakhar Chernyshev - general, Minister of War
 Alexander Lanskoy - favorite of Catherine the Great
 Yekaterina Sinyavina - pianist and composer

References

1784 in Russia
Years of the 18th century in the Russian Empire